The Giro d'Oro was an early season road bicycle race held annually in Trentino, Italy. The race was organised as a 1.1 event on the UCI Europe Tour from 2005 until 2008. It was an important semi classic race in Italy, but was not held in 2009 or after due to organisational problems.

Winners

External links
Official site 

Defunct cycling races in Italy
UCI Europe Tour races
Cycle races in Italy
Recurring sporting events established in 1983
1983 establishments in Italy
Recurring sporting events disestablished in 2008
2008 disestablishments in Italy